Brian Rotman is a British-born professor who works in the United States. Trained as a mathematician and now an established philosopher, Rotman has blended semiotics, mathematics and the history of writing in his work and teaching throughout his career. 

He is currently a distinguished humanities professor in the department of comparative studies at Ohio State University, has also taught at Stanford and given invited lectures at universities throughout the United States including Berkeley, MIT, Brown, Stanford, Duke, Notre Dame, Penn State, Minnesota, and Cornell. Rotman’s best known books include Signifying Nothing: The Semiotics of Zero which provides a wide-ranging exploration of the zero sign, Ad Infinitum... The Ghost in Turing’s Machine,
and Theory of Sets and Transfinite Numbers (written jointly with G. T. Kneebone)

Life
 
Rotman grew up above and inside his father’s sweet and tobacco shop in Brick Lane in the East End of London. He studied mathematics at the University of Nottingham, after which he taught the subject at a grammar school, a technical college and then for 20 years at Bristol University, along the way obtaining an M.Sc  in the foundations of mathematics and a Ph.D in combinatorial mathematics. During this time he wrote, with G. T. Kneebone, a graduate textbook on set theory, The Theory of Sets and Transfinite Numbers, as well as numerous papers on ordered structures and Boolean algebras, and in 1977 published Jean Piaget: Psychologist of the Real an exposition and critique of the ideas behind the work of the Swiss child psychologist. 

In 1979 he co-founded Mouth and Trousers, a London fringe theatre company based at the York and Albany pub in Camden Town, which operated for nearly four years during which time he wrote several stage plays. In 1984 he left Bristol and mathematics teaching and worked in London as a free-lance copy writer until the stock market crash of 1987 put an end to such work. In that year his essay Signifying Nothing: the Semiotics of Zero on the cultural significance of the mathematical zero sign was published. In 1990 he and his wife Lesley Ferris, an American theatre director and academic, and their two daughters, emigrated to the United States and lived in Memphis, Tennessee for 6 years. During this time, he gained expertise in the classroom training the young and spirited minds of calculus students at Memphis University School (a distinguished "school for boys") during the 1995-1996 school year.

In 1991 he published Ad Infinitum ... the Ghost in Turing’s Machine – a polemic against the ‘naturalness’ of the natural numbers. In the following years he received fellowships from Stanford Humanities Center, the National Endowment for the Humanities, and the American Council of Learned Societies. From 1996 to 1998 he was a professor of interdisciplinary studies in the English department at Louisiana State University in Baton Rouge, Louisiana and in 1998 moved to Columbus, Ohio to join the faculty of the Ohio State University, first as a professor in the Advanced Computing Center for the Arts and Design (ACCAD) and then as a member of the department of Comparative Studies. His students have called him both stunning and eccentric, and keen to bend disciplines. 

In 2000 he published Mathematics as Sign: Writing, Imagining, Counting, a collection of essays which gathered his writings on the semiotics of mathematics. 

More recently his work has focused on the gestural dimension of thought, inner speech, and the psychic effects produced by technological media, some of which, that concerned with the medium of writing,  is elaborated in the book Becoming Beside Ourselves  referred to above.

In November 2012 he was invited by Goldsmiths College in London to choreograph a mathematical dance piece entitled Ordinal 5, which was performed at the Tate Modern.

References

Notes

External links
 Rotman's website

Year of birth missing (living people)
Ohio State University faculty
Stanford University faculty
Living people
Academics of the University of Bristol
20th-century British mathematicians
21st-century British mathematicians
Alumni of the University of Nottingham
British emigrants to the United States
Alumni of the University of London
Louisiana State University faculty